Grace Martine Tandon (born October 24, 1998), better known by her stage name Daya (stylized DΛYΛ; pronounced ), is an American singer and songwriter from Mt. Lebanon, Pennsylvania. She is signed to Sandlot Records and AWAL, and released her self-titled debut extended play (EP), Daya, on September 4, 2015, which includes the song "Hide Away", which has peaked at number 23 on the Billboard Hot 100. She released her debut studio album Sit Still, Look Pretty on October 7, 2016.

Early life
Daya was born in Pittsburgh and grew up in the suburb of Mt. Lebanon, Pennsylvania. Her paternal grandfather is Indian American, a Punjabi who migrated from Punjab, India to the United States. She has four siblings, Lou, Mariana, Celia, and Avery. Her stage name Daya is the Sanskrit word for "compassion" or "kindness". In grade school she attended St. Bernard School and later she attended Mt. Lebanon High School, where she graduated. At the age of three, Daya began to learn the piano, and started jazz piano at the age of eleven. By this time, she had also learned to play the guitar, ukulele, saxophone, and flute. Daya also spent a summer studying songwriting at Interlochen Arts Camp.

At eleven, Daya enrolled as a student at the Accelerando Music Conservatory, owned by Christina Chirumbolo, in Pittsburgh. There, she met songwriter and producer Gino Barletta, a colleague of Chirumbolo who visited the school as a lecturer. Chirumbolo and Barletta founded INSIDE ACCESS, a music camp, the two worked with Daya eventually inviting her to Los Angeles in February 2015 to work on her original material.

Music career
Daya's professional career began when her parents accompanied her to Los Angeles to work with Christina Chirumbolo and Gino Barletta, founders of INSIDE ACCESS by Accelerando, Brett McLaughlin, Britten Newbill and Noisecastle III at Paramount Recording Studios. It was during one of these writing sessions that her debut single "Hide Away" was written and recorded, and Barletta consequently introduced Daya to Steve Zap of Z Entertainment. Daya, who was a junior in school at the time, said she didn't think anything would happen for a while, and went back to high school the next day. A radio promotions veteran, Zap liked the song and was interested in helping to promote the singer, leading to forming an independent label with Barletta called Artbeatz.Daya released her song "Hide Away" on April 22, 2015. The song was well-received online, enjoyed support from a number of notable bloggers including Tyler Oakley and Perez Hilton, the latter commenting "There is something very special about Daya's voice". Jason Lipshutz of Billboard also featured the single on their official website, labelling it "a gorgeous debut".

Daya made her television debut performing "Hide Away" on Today with Kathie Lee and Hoda on August 21, 2015, as Elvis Duran's Artist of the Month. She returned to Today for their summer concert series on June 28, 2016.

Following a successful debut, Daya released her self-titled EP, Daya, which features six songs, including "Hide Away", on September 4, 2015. The EP was premiered in full a day early by Billboard, and debuted at number 161 on the Billboard 200, propelling "Hide Away" to number 40 on the Billboard Pop Songs chart.

On October 30, 2015, Daya released the physical version of her debut EP through Target.

In 2016, Daya was the opening act for American pop-rap duo Jack & Jack's US tour. In February 2016, she was featured on The Chainsmokers' song "Don't Let Me Down", which eventually peaked at number 3 on the Hot 100, becoming her second top 40 entry and her first top 10. This was the only song by Daya that reached the Billboard Hot 100 Decade-End Chart. She also released the second single from her self-titled EP, "Sit Still, Look Pretty", which debuted at number 100 and peaked at number 28, her third top 40.

Daya was invited to perform at the 2016 White House Easter Egg Roll, where she and her family met President Barack Obama and the First Lady Michelle Obama. On November 15, 2016, Daya released her song "Words" as her third single from her debut album Sit Still, Look Pretty.

On December 6, 2016, it was announced that "Don't Let Me Down" had been nominated for the 59th Annual Grammy Awards. On February 12, 2017, it won the Grammy Award for Best Dance Recording making it the singer's first Grammy Award.

In March 2017, she worked for Gryffin's song "Feel Good" along with Illenium. On October 11, 2017, she released a new single, "New", through Interscope Records.

In March 2018, Daya was featured on RL Grime's song "I Wanna Know" which was released on March 16, 2018.

On June 22, 2018, Daya released her single "Safe". On July 18, 2018, she released the video for the single.

Daya released five singles in 2019. Two of the singles, "Insomnia" and "Left Me Yet", were originally intended to be on her second studio album. "Forward Motion" was intended for the movie Late Night. "Keeping It in the Dark" is on the soundtrack of the Netflix series 13 Reasons Why. "Wanted" is a collaboration with Swedish music production duo NOTD.

On October 9, 2020, she released "First Time", which was rumored to be related to a new album. It ended up being on her EP The Difference, released on May 14, 2021, together with "Montana", which she released a little earlier, on April 30 and "Bad Girl", which already charted on the Mainstream Top 40. She released her next EP In Between Dreams on September 16, 2022.

Discography

Studio albums
 Sit Still, Look Pretty (2016)

EPs
 Daya (2015)
 The Difference (2021)
 In Between Dreams (2022)

Personal life 
Daya came out publicly as bisexual in October 2018 for National Coming Out Day. On April 2, 2021, Daya went public on Instagram with her girlfriend of three years, Clyde Munroe, after releasing the single "Bad Girl" about her.

Filmography

Awards and nominations

References

External links
 

1998 births
Living people
American people of Indian descent
American people of Punjabi descent
American people of German descent
American people of English descent
American people of Irish descent
American people of British descent
American Hindus
Singers from Pennsylvania
Musicians from Pittsburgh
American child singers
American women pop singers
American women singers of Indian descent
American indie pop musicians
American dance musicians
American multi-instrumentalists
American women songwriters
21st-century American women singers
Child pop musicians
Songwriters from Pennsylvania
Grammy Award winners for dance and electronic music
People from Mt. Lebanon, Pennsylvania
Bisexual women
Bisexual musicians
LGBT people from Pennsylvania
American LGBT singers
American women in electronic music
20th-century American LGBT people
21st-century American LGBT people